Samuel William Randolph (born May 13, 1964) is an American professional golfer who has played on the PGA Tour and the Nationwide Tour.

Born in Santa Barbara, California, Randolph learned the game of golf from his father, Sam Randolph Sr., who was the head professional at La Cumbre Country Club for 38 years. As a teen, Randolph and fellow future PGA Tour player, Billy Andrade, won the Junior World Cup in 1981.

He played college golf for the University of Southern California and was a three-time first-team All-American with 13 collegiate wins. After finishing as runner-up in 1984, Randolph won the U.S. Amateur the following year. He also won the California State Amateur, the Haskins Award, and was low amateur at The Masters in 1985. In 1986, Randolph was the low amateur at both The Masters and the U.S. Open; he turned pro and joined the PGA Tour later that year.

Randolph played on the PGA Tour from 1987–1992, and won one event, the Bank of Boston Classic in 1987. His best finish in a major championship occurred as an amateur; T-18 at The Masters in 1985. From 1993 to 2002, Randolph split his playing time between the PGA Tour and the Nationwide Tour, mostly on the Nationwide Tour. He had three T-2 finishes in Nationwide Tour events in the 1990s, but no victories. After his playing career waned, Randolph moved into the teaching ranks. 

Randolph was inducted into the USC Sports Hall of fame in 2005. He lives in Fort Worth, Texas with his wife, Julie.

Amateur wins (4)
1981 Junior World Cup (with Billy Andrade), Junior World Golf Championship (Boys 15-17)
1985 U.S. Amateur, California State Amateur

Professional wins (1)

PGA Tour wins (1)

*Note: The 1987 Bank of Boston Classic was shortened to 54 holes due to rain.

Results in major championships

LA = Low amateur

CUT = missed the halfway cut
"T" indicates a tie for a place.

U.S. national team appearances
Amateur
Walker Cup: 1985 (winners)

See also
1986 PGA Tour Qualifying School graduates
1990 PGA Tour Qualifying School graduates

References

External links

American male golfers
USC Trojans men's golfers
PGA Tour golfers
PGA Tour Champions golfers
Golfers from California
Sportspeople from Santa Barbara, California
1964 births
Living people